Old Capitol may refer to:

State and federal capitol buildings

 Old Capitol (Indiana)
 Old Capitol (Iowa), also known at Iowa Old Capitol Building
 Old Capitol Building, in Olympia, Washington
 Old Brick Capitol, the temporary Capitol of the United States from 1815 to 1819 in Washington, D.C.

Other uses
 Springfield Old Capitol Art Fair, Springfield, Illinois
 Old Capitol Mall, Iowa City, Iowa
 Old Capitol City Roller Derby, Iowa City, Iowa

See also
 Old State Capitol (disambiguation)
 
 The Old Capital